Djomeh is a 2000 Iranian drama film directed by Hassan Yektapanah. It was screened in the Un Certain Regard section at the 2000 Cannes Film Festival, where it won the Caméra d'Or.

Cast
 Rashid Akbari as Habib
 Mahmoud Behraznia as Agha Mohmoud
 Valiollah Beta as The Blind Man
 Mahbobeh Khalili as Setareh
 Jalil Nazari as Djomeh

References

External links

Film Journal | A review of Djomeh 

2000 films
2000s Persian-language films
2000 drama films
Films directed by Hassan Yektapanah
Caméra d'Or winners
Iranian drama films